Heinz Schilchegger (born October 16, 1973) is an Austrian former alpine skier. He was born in Radstadt.

His best result dates from 2000, when he won a World Cup slalom race in Park City, Utah.

Outside World Cup skiing he finished second in the Powder 8 World Championships in Canada in 2004.

References 

1973 births
Living people
Austrian male alpine skiers
People from Radstadt
Sportspeople from Salzburg (state)